Cnephidia is a genus of snout moths. It was described by Ragonot in 1893, and contains the species C. kenteriella. It is found in Siberia.

References

Phycitinae
Monotypic moth genera
Moths of Asia
Taxa named by Émile Louis Ragonot